Louis "Leo" Hudson Persley (c.1888–1932), was an American architect. Persley became the first African American to register with the new Georgia State Board of Registered Architects on April 5, 1920. He was part of what was possibly the nation’s first black architecture firm, Taylor and Persley, a partnership founded in July 1920 with Robert Robinson Taylor. He had several spellings of his name including Louis Hudison Persely, Lewis H. Persley, and Louis Pursley.

Biography 
Louis Persley was born and raised in Macon, Georgia, to Black parents Maxine and Thomas K. Persley. He attended Lincoln University, and graduated from Carnegie Institute of Technology (now Carnegie Mellon University) in 1914. He was a professor of architectural and mechanical drawing from 1915 until 1916 at Tuskegee Institute in Tuskegee, Alabama.

In July 1920, Persely and fellow architect Robert Robinson Taylor had formed a black architecture firm together, Taylor and Persley. This was possibly the first black architecture firm in the United States. They collaborated on many designs, including of several buildings on Tuskegee Institute (now Tuskegee University) campus.

He died on July 13, 1932 at the age of 42, of kidney failure, and he is buried at Linwood Cemetery in the Pleasant Hill neighborhood of Macon, Georgia. A historical marker commemorates him in front of the First AME Church in Athens, Georgia. Persley's profile was included in the biographical dictionary African American Architects: A Biographical Dictionary, 1865–1945 (2004).

Buildings

First African Methodist Episcopal Church (1916) in Athens, Georgia
Campbell Chapel A.M.E. Church (1920) in Americus, Georgia; listed on the National Register of Historic Places
Chambliss Hotel (1922), Macon, Georgia
Colored Masonic Temple (1922; or 'Most Worshipful Prince Hall Grand Lodge') in Birmingham, Alabama; for the Free and Accepted Masons
Funeral home (1928), Macon, Georgia
Samaritan Building, Athens, Georgia (demolished)
Dinkins Memorial Building at Selma University, Selma, Alabama; with Robert Robinson Taylor
 Masonic Temple in Birmingham, Alabama; with Robert Robinson Taylor
Several buildings on the campus of Tuskegee Institute, Tuskegee, Alabama; with Robert Robinson Taylor
James Hall Dormitory (1921), Tuskegee Institute
Sage Hall Dormitory (1927), Tuskegee Institute
Logan Hall Dormitory (1931), Tuskegee Institute
Armstrong Science Building (1932), Tuskegee Institute
Hollis Burke Frissell Library (1932), Tuskegee Institute

See also 
 African-American architects
 McKissack and McKissack, another early Black architecture firm

References

External links 
 Video: Architecture, Race and Academe from Massachusetts Institute of Technology

1888 births
1932 deaths
20th-century American architects
People from Macon, Georgia
Carnegie Mellon University alumni
African-American architects
20th-century African-American people
Lincoln University (Pennsylvania) alumni